The Douglas C-54 Skymaster is a four-engined transport aircraft used by the United States Army Air Forces in World War II and the Korean War. Like the Douglas C-47 Skytrain derived from the DC-3, the C-54 Skymaster was derived from a civilian airliner, the Douglas DC-4. Besides transport of cargo, the C-54 also carried presidents, prime ministers, and military staff. Dozens of variants of the C-54 were employed in a wide variety of non-combat roles such as air-sea rescue, scientific and military research, and missile tracking and recovery. During the Berlin Airlift it hauled coal and food supplies to West Berlin. After the Korean War it continued to be used for military and civilian uses by more than 30 countries. It was one of the first aircraft to carry the President of the United States, the first being President Franklin D. Roosevelt during World War II.

Design and development

With the looming entry of the United States into World War II, in June 1941 the War Department took over the provision orders for the airlines for the Douglas DC-4 and allocated them to the United States Army Air Forces with the designation C-54 Skymaster. The first, a C-54, flew from Clover Field in Santa Monica, California on 14 February 1942.

To meet military requirements the first civil production aircraft had four additional auxiliary fuel tanks in the main cabin which reduced the passenger seats to 26. The following batch of aircraft, designated C-54A, were built with a stronger floor and a cargo door with a hoist and winch. The first C-54A was delivered in February 1943. The C-54B, introduced in March 1944, had integral fuel tanks in the outer wings, allowing two of the cabin tanks to be removed. This change allowed 49 seats (or 16 stretchers) to be fitted. The , a hybrid for Presidential use, had a C-54A fuselage with four cabin fuel tanks and C-54B wings with built in tanks to achieve maximum range.

The most common variant was the C-54D, which entered service in August 1944. Based on the C-54B, it was fitted with more powerful R-2000-11 engines. With the C-54E, the last two cabin fuel tanks were moved to the wings which would allow more freight or 44 passenger seats.

Aircraft transferred to the United States Navy were designated Douglas R5D.  With the introduction of the Tri-Service aircraft designation system in 1962, all R5Ds were re-designated C-54.

Operational history
C-54s began service with the USAAF in 1942, carrying up to 26 passengers, later versions carrying up to 50 passengers. The C-54 was one of the most commonly used long-range transports by the U.S. armed forces in World War II. Of the C-54s produced, 515 were manufactured in Santa Monica, California and 655 were manufactured at Orchard Place/Douglas Field, in unincorporated Cook County, Illinois, near Chicago (later the site of O'Hare International Airport).

During World War II, the C-54 was used by Franklin D. Roosevelt, Douglas MacArthur, and Winston Churchill. The American delegates to the Casablanca Conference used the Skymaster. The C-54 was also used by the Royal Air Force, the French Air Force, and the armed forces of at least 12 other nations.

President Harry S. Truman signed the National Security Act of 1947, which created the U.S. Air Force, on board Sacred Cow, the Presidential VC-54C which is preserved at the National Museum of the United States Air Force near Dayton, Ohio. More than 300 C-54s and R5Ds formed the backbone of the US contribution to the Berlin Airlift in 1948. They also served as the main airlift during the Korean War. After the Korean War, the C-54 was replaced by the Douglas C-124 Globemaster II, but continued to be used by the U.S. Air Force until 1972. The last active C-54 Skymaster in U.S. Navy service (C-54Q, BuNo 56501, of the Navy Test Pilot School, NAS Patuxent River) was retired on 2 April 1974.

In late 1945, several hundred C-54s were surplus to U.S. military requirements and these were converted for civil airline operation, many by Douglas Aircraft at its aircraft plants. The aircraft were sold to airlines around the world. By January 1946, Pan American Airways was operating their Skymasters on transatlantic scheduled services to Europe and beyond. Trans-Pacific schedules from San Francisco to Auckland began on 6 June 1946. After disposal by the U.S. Air Force and U.S. Navy, many C-54s were modified for use in civilian firefighting and air tanker roles. This included fitting tanks inside and under the fuselage and the fitting of dumping and spraying equipment also on the wing trailing edges. C-54s continued in this role until the late 1990s.

Variants

C-54
First production variant adapted from DC-4, 24 built.

First military version with strengthened airframe, increased fuel capacity, provision for passengers or cargo, Navy equivalent R5D-1, 252 built.
C-54B
Increased fuel capacity in the wing, One was used by Winston Churchill, 220 built.

Same as C-54B but with R-2000-11 engines, 380 built.

Further revision to fuel tanks and provision for rapid conversion from passenger to cargo, 125 built.

Same as C-54E but with different version of the R-2000 engine. 400 ordered, of which 162 were completed and the remainder were cancelled at the end of WW2.

Operators

Accidents and incidents

Crashing in the sea (1947)
On 3 July 1947: US Army Air Force C-54G 45-519 crashed in the Atlantic 294 mi off Florida after a loss of control caused by turbulence from a storm, killing the six crew.

Massachusetts crash (1948)

On 14 May 1948, an army transport plane flying through a rainstorm crashed in Northampton, Massachusetts, killing the three crew members aboard.

Disappearance (1950)

On 26 January 1950, a C-54D operated by the United States Air Force disappeared during a flight between Anchorage-Elmendorf Air Force Base (Alaska) and Great Falls Air Force Base (Montana) with a crew of eight and 36 passengers (34 service personnel and two civilians). No trace of the aircraft or its occupants has ever been found.

Crashed (1950)
On 19 September 1950, a U.S. Navy C-54 en-route to Korea crashed into the sea approximately one minute after takeoff from Kwajalein Atoll, Marshall Islands. The aircraft had 26 personnel aboard including eleven nurses. There were no survivors.

Crashing in the sea (1951)
On 31 January 1951, the C-54D with tail number 282 of the Portuguese Military Aeronautics, operated by the Search and Rescue Squadron of the Lajes Air Base, Azores, flying from the Lisbon Airport back to its base, crashed in the Atlantic, when approaching Lajes. All of the 14 people on board (two pilots, nine mechanics and three other military personnel) were killed.

Berlin corridor attack (1952)
On 29 April 1952, an Air France Douglas C-54A (registration F-BELI) operating a scheduled service from Frankfurt Rhein-Main Airport to Berlin Tempelhof Airport came under sustained attack from two Soviet MiG-15 fighters while passing through one of the Allied air corridors over East Germany. Although the attack had severely damaged the aircraft, necessitating the shutdown of engines number three and four, the pilot in command of the aircraft managed to carry out a safe emergency landing at Tempelhof Airport. A subsequent inspection of the aircraft's damage revealed that it had been hit by 89 shots fired from the Soviet MiGs. There were no fatalities among the 17 occupants (six crew, 11 passengers) despite the severity of the attack. The Soviet military authorities defended this attack on an unarmed civilian aircraft by claiming the Air France plane was outside the air corridor at the time of attack.

Shoot-down by the PRC (1954)

On 23 July 1954, a Douglas C-54 Skymaster civilian airliner, registration VR-HEU, operated by Cathay Pacific Airways, en route from Bangkok to Hong Kong, was shot down by Chinese PLAAF Lavochkin La-11 fighters off the coast of Hainan Island, killing ten people.

Explosion in North Africa (1955)
On 11 December 1955, the C-54 of the United States Air Force's 1700th Air Transport Group, based at Kelly Field, San Antonio, Tex. The transport crashed in the Gomor district near the border, between French and Spanish Morocco. Flying from Wheelus Field in Tripoli to Casablanca, it was believed en route to the United States. Eight United States airmen died when their plane exploded in the rugged Riff Mountains of North Africa.

Disappearance (1964)
On 28 March 1964, a C-54A disappeared over the Pacific (about 1120 km west of San Francisco—last reported position) on an executive passenger flight from Honolulu International Airport, Hawaii to Los Angeles International Airport, California. The pilot reported a fire in No. 2 engine, which might make it necessary to ditch. Nothing more was heard from the aircraft, nor was any trace of it found despite an extensive search. Three crew and six passengers died in the accident.

Specifications (C-54G-DO)

Notable appearances in media
A C-54, registration C-FIQM (Buffalo 5-721 (tail 57)), was used as a substitute Lancaster bomber due to its similar top speed and maximum payload, for a recreation of Operation Chastise with its bouncing bomb. It was filmed in the UK documentary Dambusters: Building the Bouncing Bomb, Canadian documentary Dambusters Fly Again, Nova season 39 episode "Bombing Hitler's Dams", and Ice Pilots NWT season 3 episode 2 "Dambusters". The 1950 drama, "The Big Lift" features C-54s flying the Berlin Airlift.

See also

References

Notes

Citations

Bibliography

 Berry, Peter et al. The Douglas DC-4. Tonbridge, Kent, UK: Air-Britain (Historians) Ltd., 1967.
 Blewett, R. Survivors. Coulsden, UK: Aviation Classics, 2007. .
 Eastwood, Tony and John Roach. Piston Engine Airliner Production List. West Drayton, UK: Aviation Hobby Shop, 1991. .
 Francillon, René. McDonnell Douglas Aircraft Since 1920: Volume I. London: Putnam, 1979. .
 Lavery, Brian: Churchill Goes to War: Winston's Wartime Journeys. Annapolis, Maryland: Naval Institute Press, 2007. .
 Milberry, Larry. The Canadair North Star. Toronto: CANAV Books, 1982. .
 Pearcy, Arthur. Douglas Propliners: DC-1–DC-7. Shrewsbury, UK: Airlife Publishing, 1995. .
 Pickler, Ron and Larry Milberry. Canadair: The First 50 Years. Toronto: CANAV Books, 1995. .
 Yenne, Bill. McDonnell Douglas: A Tale of Two Giants.Greenwich, Connecticut: Bison Books, 1985. .

External links

AN 01-40NU-1 Handbook Flight Operating Instructions USAF Series C-54G and Navy Model R5D-5 Aircraft
Canadair DC4M North Star
Moose Jaw crash at virtualmuseum.ca
PSA History/Oldtimers Page
Berlin Airlift Historical Foundation—Operates C-54 "Spirit of Freedom" as flying Berlin Airlift Museum
Air Force Association page on C-54
Warbird Alley: C-54 page
Cockpit View of C-54 During Landing/Taxi
Boeing McDonnell Douglas page on DC-4
The last passenger certified & built DC-4s in the world
Vintage Wings of Canada Canadair North Star showing RR Merlin installation

DC-04
Four-engined tractor aircraft
1940s United States airliners
Douglas C-054 Skymaster
Douglas C-54 Skymaster
 C-54
Aircraft first flown in 1942
Four-engined piston aircraft